Arjit Taneja (born 10 November 1992) is an Indian television actor and model. He made his television debut with V The Serial and then appeared in the reality shows MTV Splitsvilla 6 and Box Cricket League 1 and TV fiction dramas Kumkum Bhagya, Kaleerein, Bahu Begum, Naagin 5 & Naagin 6 , Nath – Zewar Ya Zanjeer and Banni Chow Home Delivery.

Life and career

Early life and career beginnings (1992–2014)

Arjit Taneja belongs to a Punjabi family. He attended modern school, Delhi and graduated with a BA degree in computer programming at University of Delhi.

In November 2010, he joined the modelling agency Elite Model Management India Pvt. Ltd. 2 years later in mid-2012, Taneja moved from Delhi to Mumbai and began his acting career on television that year as the friend of Karan Kundra's character in Channel V India's V The Serial, produced by Ekta Kapoor.

In 2013 he collaborated with Ekta Kapoor on Sony TV's Bade Achhe Lagte Hain, where he had a very small role. Also he contested in MTV India's MTV Splitsvilla 6 and later in Sony TV's Box Cricket League 1, the latter of which was his third with Kapoor.

Breakthrough and establishment (2014–present)

Taneja's career finally saw a turning point when he signed the parallel lead role of Purab Khanna in Zee TV's popular daily soap Kumkum Bhagya, created by Kapoor. He won the Best Supporting Actor award at the Zee Gold Awards, and exited the show in 2016. 

Simultaneously along with Kumkum Bhagya , he was seen as Bilal Khan in another Ekta Kapoor production — Sony TV's Pyaar Ko Ho Jaane Do in 2015. In 2016, he did Zing's Pyaar Tune Kya Kiya and participated in Colors TV's Box Cricket League 2 produced by Ekta Kapoor .

In 2017, Arjit then moved to Indonesia for a few months where he was cast as lead in the Indonesian show Nadin ANTV alongside his former co-star from Kumkum Bhagya Mrunal Thakur and Indonesia Actress Dewi Persik.

Taneja left Indonesia and headed back to Bombay where he landed his first lead role in a TV show. In February 2018, Taneja began essaying the main character of Vivaan Kapoor in  Zee TV's  Kaleerein. It went off air in November 2018. 

In May 2018, Arjit also appeared as a guest in Zee TV's talk show Juzz Baatt with Sana Saeed, Adnan Khan and Karan Jotwani. 

Arjit was a Red Carpet host for Zee Rishtey Awards 2019.

His next TV series was Colors TV's love triangle-themed Bahu Begum which premiered in July 2019. In the show Taneja was cast as Azaan Akhtar Mirza, the Nawab of Bhopal which co-starred Samiksha Jaiswal and Diana Khan. Bahu Begum culminated in January 2020. 

Arjit also made a special appearance at the ITA Awards in 2020.

In January 2021, he bagged the cameo role of Farishta, an angel in the supernatural revenge thriller Naagin 5  and reprised the same role in February 2021 for Kuch Toh Hai: Naagin Ek Naye Rang Mein, both of which were aired on Colors TV and created by Ekta Kapoor .

Arjit then landed the lead role as Shambhu Thakur on Nath – Zewar Ya Zanjeer on Dangal TV. The show premiered on August 23, 2021. But after a few months inside the show, he decided to quit the show. Arjit when interviewed said, “he did not see his role shaping up as he wanted it to be”. Arjit’s last shoot day was March 7th 2022 and his final episode aired on March 10, 2022, Episode 172.

On March 22, 2022, it was confirmed Arjit had been roped in to be a candidate as a suitor for Parineeti Chopra alongside other television actors Vishal Aditya Singh and Shivin Narang on Hunarbaaz: Desh Ki Shaan "Parineeti Ka Swayamvar" on Colors TV. Taneja was seen doing just about everything from presenting her with roses, complimenting her with his soothing words, to getting down on one knee and even cooking to impress the Hasee Toh Phasee actress. Judges Karan Johar, Mithun Chakraborty and hosts Bharti Singh and Haarsh Limbachiya were there to assist Parineeti Chopra in taking the right decision. Veteran singer Kumar Sanu also joined the panel as a special guest. When called on stage to showcase his cooking skill by making Parineeti Chopra’s favorite ‘Aloo Paratha’, Taneja was quite impressive. The actress could not resist the taste and initially she announced the winner : Best aloo paratha goes to her Punjabi munda, Arjit. Still indecisive of a suitor, Karan Johar then suggested they do a Bollywood Quiz via a Miss India format. Parineeti then chose Arjit as ‘Mr. India’ and Runner-Up Shivin Narang. After being quizzed, Taneja won with his impeccable and quick responses. Hunarbaaz: Desh Ki Shaan special episodes were aired on Saturday 26 and Sunday 27 March at 9pm and 7pm on Colors TV.

In April 2022, Taneja once more reprised his role as Farishta in Naagin 6 on Colors TV. 
 
In September 2022, it was made public knowledge that Arjit would join StarPlus show Banni Chow Home Delivery which starred Ulka Gupta and Pravisht Mishra. His character is a ‘Rockstar’ Agastya Kapoor. Arjit was quoted as saying, "I was looking for something that could challenge me as an actor and the Banni Chow offer came at the right time. I will have a grand entry as a rockstar and it will bring along a lot of mystery and suspense”. His first episode aired on September 14, 2022. After a few months on the show, Arjit decided to move on and his last shoot day was December 1st 2022. His final episode aired on December 11, 2022.

In January 2023, Arjit and Sanaya Irani teamed up for another collab.

Filmography

Films

Television

Music videos

Awards and nominations

References

External links

 
 

Living people
Punjabi people
Indian male soap opera actors
Male actors in Hindi television
Male actors from Delhi
Indian male models
Actors from Mumbai
1992 births